Wee1 is a nuclear kinase belonging to the Ser/Thr family of protein kinases in the fission yeast Schizosaccharomyces pombe (S. pombe). Wee1 has a molecular mass of 96 kDa and is a key regulator of cell cycle progression. 
It  influences cell size by inhibiting the entry into mitosis, through inhibiting Cdk1. Wee1 has homologues in many other organisms, including mammals.

Introduction 

The regulation of cell size is critical to ensure functionality of a cell. Besides environmental factors such as nutrients, growth factors and functional load, cell size is also controlled by a cellular cell size checkpoint.

Wee1 is a component of this checkpoint. It is a kinase determining the timepoint of entry into mitosis, thus influencing the size of the daughter cells. Loss of Wee1 function will produce smaller than normal daughter cell, because cell division occurs prematurely.

Its name is derived from the Scottish dialect word wee, meaning small - its discoverer Paul Nurse was working at the University of Edinburgh in Scotland at the time of discovery.

Function 

Wee1 inhibits Cdk1 by phosphorylating it on two different sites, Tyr15 and Thr14. Cdk1 is crucial for the cyclin-dependent passage of the various cell cycle checkpoints.
At least three checkpoints exist for which the inhibition of Cdk1 by Wee1 is important:

 G2/M checkpoint: Wee1 phosphorylates the amino acids Tyr15 and Thr14 of Cdk1, which keeps the kinase activity of Cdk1 low and prevents entry into mitosis; in S. pombe further cell growth can occur. Wee1 mediated inactivation of Cdk1 has been shown to be ultrasensitive as a result of substrate competition. During mitotic entry the activity of Wee1 is decreased by several regulators and thus Cdk1 activity is increased. In S. pombe, Pom1, a protein kinase, localizes to the cell poles.  This activates a pathway in which Cdr2 inhibits Wee1 through Cdr1.  Cdk1 itself negatively regulates Wee1 by phosphorylation, which leads to a positive feedback loop. The decreased Wee1 activity alone is not sufficient for mitotic entry: Synthesis of cyclins and an activating phosphorylation by a Cdk activating kinase (CAK) are also required.
 Cell size checkpoint: There is evidence for the existence of a cell size checkpoint, which prevents small cells from entering mitosis. Wee1 plays a role in this checkpoint by coordinating cell size and cell cycle progression.
 DNA damage checkpoint: This checkpoint also controls the G2/M transition. In S. pombe this checkpoint delays the mitosis entry of cells with DNA damage (for example induced by gamma radiation). The lengthening of the G2 phase depends on Wee1; wee1 mutants have no prolonged G2 phase after gamma irradiation.

Epigenetic function of Wee1 kinase has also been reported. Wee1 was shown to phosphorylate histone H2B at tyrosine 37 residue which regulated global expression of histones.

Homologues 

The WEE1 gene has two known homologues in humans, WEE1 (also known as WEE1A) and WEE2 (WEE1B). The corresponding proteins are Wee1-like protein kinase and Wee1-like protein kinase 2 which act on the human Cdk1 homologue Cdk1.

The homologue to Wee1 in budding yeast Saccharomyces cerevisiae is called Swe1.

Regulation  

In S. pombe, Wee1 is phosphorylated
Cdk1 and cyclin B make up the maturation promoting factor (MPF) which promotes the entry into mitosis. It is inactivated by phosphorylation through Wee1 and activated by the phosphatase Cdc25C. Cdc25C in turn is activated by Polo kinase and inactivated by Chk1. Thus in S. pombe Wee1 regulation is mainly under the control of phosphorylation through the polarity kinase, Pom1's, pathway including Cdr2 and Cdr1.

At the G2/M transition, Cdk1 is activated by Cdc25 through dephosphorylation of Tyr15. At the same time, Wee1 is inactivated through phosphorylation at its C-terminal catalytic domain by Nim1/Cdr1. Also, the active MPF will promote its own activity by activating Cdc25 and inactivating Wee1, creating a positive feedback loop, though this is not yet understood in detail.

Higher eukaryotes regulate Wee1 via phosphorylation and degradation
In higher eukaryotes, Wee1 inactivation occurs both by phosphorylation and degradation. 
The protein complex SCFβ-TrCP1/2 is an E3 ubiquitin ligase that functions in Wee1A ubiquitination. The M-phase kinases Polo-like kinase (Plk1) and Cdc2 phosphorylate two serine residues in Wee1A which are recognized by SCFβ-TrCP1/2.

S. cerevisiae homologue Swe1 
In S. cerevisiae, cyclin-dependent kinase Cdc28 (Cdk1 homologue) is phosphorylated by Swe1 (Wee1 homologue) and dephosphorylated by Mih1 (Cdc25 homologue). Nim1/Cdr1 homologue in S. cerevisiae, Hsl1, together with its related kinases Gin4 and Kcc4 localize Swe1 to the bud-neck. Bud-neck associating kinases Cla4 and Cdc5 (polo kinase homologue) phosphorylate Swe1 at different stages of the cell cycle. Swe1 is also phosphorylated by Clb2-Cdc28 which serves as a recognition for further phosphorylation by Cdc5.

The S. cerevisiae protein Swe1 is also regulated by degradation. Swe1 is hyperphosphorylated by Clb2-Cdc28 and Cdc5 which may be a signal for ubiquitination and degradation by SCF E3 ubiquitin ligase complex as in higher eukaryotes.

Role in cancer 

The mitosis promoting factor MPF also regulates DNA-damage induced apoptosis. Negative regulation of MPF by WEE1 causes aberrant mitosis and thus resistance to DNA-damage induced apoptosis. Kruppel-like factor 2 (KLF2) negatively regulates human WEE1, thus increasing sensitivity to DNA-damage induced apoptosis in cancer cells.

Mutant phenotype 

Wee1 acts as a dosage-dependent inhibitor of mitosis. Thus, the amount of Wee1 protein correlates with the size of the cells:

The fission yeast mutant wee1, also called wee1−,  divides at a significantly smaller cell size than wildtype cells. Since Wee1 inhibits entry into mitosis, its absence will lead to division at a premature stage and sub-normal cell size. Conversely,
when Wee1 expression is increased, mitosis is delayed and cells grow to a large size before dividing.

See also 
 Wee1-like protein kinase
 Cell cycle

Notes

References

External links 
 Drosophila wee - The Interactive Fly

Cell cycle
Fungal proteins
EC 2.7.11